Anna Voronova  (born December 5, 2003, Kyiv, Ukraine) is a Ukrainian singer, laureate of the special prize of the "Sanremo Junior" festival, silver prizewinner of the “Euro Pop Contest Berliner Perle” vocal contest, Grand Prix winner of the International Festival “Mediterranean Sea”, participant of the “Voice. Children-3 "(«Голос. Дети-3», Dmytro Monatik's team).

Biography 
Anna Voronova was born in the family of Ukrainian TV presenter, journalist, artist and designer Tetyana Ramus and Ukrainian businessman and philanthropist Igor Voronov.

At the age of three, she was selected for the children's preparatory theatrical school "Chunga-Changa" (Kyiv). At the age of six, after three years of classes in acting, rhetoric, direction and cinematography, Anna entered the international lyceum.

In 2012-2013 she studied theater in Los Angeles, California: "Diane Christiansen Coaching", "3-2-1 Talent Showcase Acting School with Mae Ross", "Glee Musical Theater Camp / Kids on Stage" (Los Angeles). Anna is engaged in ballroom dances, hip-hop in the school of dance "Millenium", playing the piano, flute and saxophone.

Participated in screen tests of Universal Studios.

Since 2016 Anna becomes a participant in TV projects "Music Academy Junior", "Generation Junior".

Besides, she participates in various charity events.

Vocal activity 

Since 2014 Anna has been professionally engaged in singing in the production center "PARADIZ".
In 2014 she took part in the II International festival-competition of musical art "Kyiv color", where she became a laureate of the first degree in the nomination "Variety Vocal".

At the same year, she took the 2nd place in the Vocals nomination at the VIII TV festival "TV START" (Kyiv), became the laureate of the 1st prize of the XVI All-Ukrainian festival-contest "Children's Song Opening Day" (Kyiv) and the laureate of the 1st prize in the International Festival "Paradise Holiday" in Greece.

In 2015 Anna won a special prize in the middle age category of the International vocal competition the «Sanremo Junior» festival in Italy.

In 2016 she participated in the project of the TV channel "1 + 1" "The Voice Kids (Ukrainian season 3)". On blind auditions on October 9, 2016, Anna sang the song of John Newman "Love me again" and went to the Monatik’s team.

At the same year Anna became the winner of the "Future of the Nation" prize in the nomination "Talented Child Ukraine" (Kyiv). Also she became the finalist of the Young Voice of Music Box vocal project, took 2nd place in the "Euro Pop Contest Berliner Perle" vocal competition in Berlin, Germany and won the Grand Prix of the International Festival "Mediterranean Sea" in Israel.

In May 2018, at the annual International Music Festival "PARADISE HOLIDAY" in Greece, Anna Voronova won a special prize - a creative duet with the band "THE HARDKISS".

Also, within the framework of the festival, Anna Voronova became an owner of the Grand Prix of the model contest "Fashion models Paradise" and won the cover of the magazine "Young Lady".

References

External links 
 
 http://annavoronova.com Personal website
 
 

2003 births
Living people
Musicians from Kyiv
Ukrainian child singers
21st-century Ukrainian women singers